Hoddle (originally Hoddle Range) was a railway station on the South Gippsland line in South Gippsland, Victoria. The station was opened during the 1890s and was one of the first to close on the South Gippsland line, closing in the 1960s.

Disused railway stations in Victoria (Australia)
Transport in Gippsland (region)
Shire of South Gippsland